is a railway station located in the town of  Mitake,  Gifu Prefecture,  Japan, operated by the private railway operator Meitetsu.

Lines

Station layout
Mitake Station has a single ground-level dead-headed side platform. The station is unattended.

Adjacent stations

|-
!colspan=5|Nagoya Railroad

History
Mitake Station opened on July 1, 1952.

Surrounding area
Mitake-juku

See also
 List of Railway Stations in Japan

References

External links
 
  

Railway stations in Japan opened in 1952
Stations of Nagoya Railroad
Railway stations in Gifu Prefecture
Mitake, Gifu